The Kaliakra gas field is a natural gas field located on the continental shelf of the Black Sea located approximately 30km Southeast of Varna, Bulgaria. It was discovered by Melrose Resources plc in 2007 and brought on production in November 2010 through a subsea wellhead and tie-back pipeline to the Galata field platform infrastructure to the West.

Discovery 
The Kaliakra gas field was discovered in late 2007 by Melrose Resources plc, the discovery well was drilled using the Atwood Southern Cross semi-submersible drilling rig.

Development 
The majority of the operational development project work for the Kaliakra field development plan was undertaken during 2010 by Melrose Resources plc. The field came on production in November 2010.

Production and Reserves 

Operator 
The current operator of the field is Petroceltic who merged with Melrose Resources Plc in 2012.  Petroceltic was acquired by Worldview Capital Management, a Cayman Island-based financial fund in June 2016.

References

Black Sea energy
Natural gas fields in Bulgaria